The annual Aloha World Sevens rugby tournament brings 24 Under-20 teams from 24 nations to Hawaii to compete in a three-day event that includes cultural showcases from participating countries. The tournament is sanctioned by USA Rugby.  
   
Sevens, which is also referred to as seven-a-side rugby, rugby Sevens, rugby 7’s, and rugby VIIs, is rapidly gaining worldwide participation, making it one of the fastest growing sports in the world. From its beginnings at the Melrose Club in the Scottish Borders in 1883, Sevens has grown to where World Rugby (formerly the International Rugby Board) now has 117 Unions in membership and it is expected to grow into the 205 countries that make up the Olympic movement as Sevens becomes an official competitive part of the 2016 Summer Olympics in Rio de Janeiro and the 2020 Summer Olympics in Tokyo.
  
Part of the appeal of Sevens is the spreading of the players on the field that takes place as fewer players cover the same size field covered by 15 players in traditional rugby and shorter time periods, which makes the game proceed at a much quicker pace. Indeed, noted Sports Historian Jack Pollard noted that "Sevens matches are unpredictable tests of stamina, ball-handling expertise and blistering pace".

The Aloha World Sevens rugby tournament takes place at the Aloha Stadium on the island of Oahu. The tournament places 16 top Under-20 male teams from 16 countries against each other and 8 top Under-20 female teams from 8 countries against each other, each vying for the Aloha World Sevens title.

Teams invited to the 2014 Aloha World Sevens tournament, to be held from June 5–7, are from: USA, New Zealand, Australia, South Africa, Samoa, Fiji, Tonga, France, England, Ireland, Wales, Scotland, Kenya, Hong Kong, Argentina, Italy, Japan, China, United Arab Emirates, Brazil, Canada, Philippines, Spain, Portugal, Russia, Uruguay, Georgia, Namibia, Romania, South Korea, Belgium, Zimbabwe, Tunisia, Netherlands, Cook Islands, and American Samoa.

The annual event is organized by AWS Events Group.

References

External links
Aloha World Sevens
Aloha Stadium
USA Rugby

Rugby union in Hawaii
International rugby union competitions hosted by the United States
Rugby sevens competitions in the United States